Keithroy Cornelius (born 3 May 1968) is a former West Indian cricketer. Cornelius was a right-handed batsman who bowled right-arm fast.  He also plays association football for the United States Virgin Islands football team.

In February 2008, the United States Virgin Islands were invited to take part in the 2008 Stanford 20/20, whose matches held official Twenty20 status. Cornelius made a single appearance for the team in their preliminary round match against St Kitts. In a match which they won by 4 wickets, he bowled two expensive wicketless overs which cost 20 runs, while with the bat he was dismissed for a duck by Elsroy Powell.

In football, Cornelius has made six appearances for the United States Virgin Islands, the last of which came in a 6–1 defeat to Curaçao in a qualification match for the 2014 World Cup, in which he scored his team's only goal, to become one of the oldest scorers, aged 43 years and 196 days.

Football career

International goals
Scores and results list the U.S. Virgin Islands' goal tally first.

References

External links
Keithroy Cornelius at ESPNcricinfo
Keithroy Cornelius at CricketArchive

1968 births
Living people
People from Saint Thomas, U.S. Virgin Islands
United States Virgin Islands cricketers
United States Virgin Islands soccer players
Association football midfielders
United States Virgin Islands international soccer players